The Public Records Act 1967 is an Act of the Parliament of the United Kingdom passed during Harold Wilson's Labour government.

The Act amended the Public Records Act 1958 by reducing the period whereby public records (apart from those deemed "sensitive" by the Lord Chancellor) were closed to the public from fifty years to thirty years, the "thirty-year rule". It took effect on 1 January 1968.

The effect of the Act was to make the public records of the First World War available, but the records from the Second World War did not become available until 1972.

See also
Public Record Office

Notes

United Kingdom Acts of Parliament 1967